Easy listening is a popular music genre and radio format.

Easy Listening may also refer to:

Easy Listening (Johnny Smith album), 1958
Easy Listening (Maaya Sakamoto album), 2001
Easy Listening (Pigface album), 2003
Easy Listening (Billboard chart), a radio chart format